Sir Charles Brisbane KCB (1770 – December 1829) was an officer of the Royal Navy who served during the American War of Independence, and with distinction under Lords Hood and Nelson.

He took part in 1796 in the capitulation of Saldanha Bay, the capture of the Spanish frigate Pomona off Havana, Cuba in 1806, and then in 1807 was in command at capture of the island of Curaçao. He was made governor of St. Vincent in 1808, and served as such until his death in 1829.

Family and early life
Charles Brisbane was born in mid-1770 and baptised on 12 July at Deal in Kent, the fourth but eldest surviving son of Captain (later Admiral) John Brisbane and his wife Mary Young. He was entered on board , commanded by his father, in 1779. He was present at the action of 8 January 1780, and the relief of the Great Siege of Gibraltar in January 1780, and later served in the West Indies. At the end of 1781 he was placed on board  with Captain Henry Savage, and was present at the Battle of the Saintes off Dominica, on 12 April 1782, where he was badly wounded by a splinter.

He continued serving during the peace, and after the Spanish armament in 1790 was promoted to the rank of lieutenant on 22 November. In 1793 he was aboard the frigate , in which he went out to the Mediterranean, and was employed on shore at Toulon during the occupation of the city, and afterwards in Corsica, both at the siege of Saint-Florent and at the siege of Bastia. Brisbane was under the immediate orders of Captain Horatio Nelson, and like him sustained the loss of an eye from a severe wound in the head inflicted by the small fragments of an iron shot.

Command
In the autumn of 1795 he was sent from Gibraltar to convoy two troopships to Barbados. On his way there he fell in with a Dutch squadron, which he kept company with, sending the transports on by themselves; finding that the Dutch were bound for the Cape of Good Hope, he carried the intelligence to Sir George Elphinstone, the commander-in-chief on that station, acting contrary to the orders under which he had sailed. After the capture of the Dutch ships in Saldanha Bay on 18 August 1796, he was promoted by Sir George to the command of one of them; he had previously, 22 July, been promoted by Sir John Jervis, the commander-in-chief in the Mediterranean, under whose orders he had sailed, and he also received the thanks of the admiralty.

He continued on the Cape station in command of the frigate , and was in her at Saint Helena when a mutiny broke out on board. In the course of 1798 he returned to England with Pringle in command of the frigate , and in 1801 was appointed to the frigate , one of the squadron off Brest, under Admiral William Cornwallis.

Napoleonic Wars
He was then moved into , on which he took part in the action of 28 June 1803, and in which on his way home he was nearly lost in a hurricane. In 1805 Brisbane was appointed to the frigate , which he took to the West Indies. Early in 1806 he ran Arethusa ashore amongst the Colorados rocks, near the north-west end of Cuba, and she was got off only by throwing all her guns overboard. In this defenceless condition she encountered a Spanish ship of the line off Havana, but the enemy vessel ran in under the guns of Morro Castle.

Having refitted at Jamaica, Arethusa was in August again off Havana, and on the 23rd, in company with the 44-gun , captured the Spanish frigate Pomona, anchored near a battery, and supported by ten gunboats. The gunboats were all destroyed and the battery blown up, apparently by some accident to the furnaces for heating shot. The heated shot had temporarily set Arethusa on fire, she had two men killed and thirty-two men, including Captain Brisbane, wounded.

On 1 January 1807 Brisbane, still in Arethusa, with three other frigates, having been sent off Curaçao, reduced the forts and captured the island from the Dutch. For his success on this occasion Brisbane was knighted, and he, as well as the other three captains, received a gold medal. He continued in command of Arethusa till near the end of 1808, when he was transferred to the 74-gun , but was almost immediately afterwards appointed governor of the island of Saint Vincent. He held the post, without any further service at sea, until his death on the island in December 1829. On 2 January 1815 he had been nominated a KCB, and attained his flag rank on 12 August 1819.

Family
He married Sarah, daughter of Sir James Patey, of Reading, and left several children.

His daughter Lavinia married Lt General John Frederick Ewart and was mother to both General Sir John Alexander Ewart (1821–1904) and Charles Brisbane Ewart.

References

Attribution

1770 births
1829 deaths
Royal Navy rear admirals
Royal Navy personnel of the French Revolutionary Wars
Royal Navy personnel of the Napoleonic Wars
Knights Commander of the Order of the Bath
Governors of British Saint Vincent and the Grenadines